Mount Erasmus is a  mountain summit located in the North Saskatchewan River valley of Banff National Park, in the Canadian Rockies of Alberta, Canada. Its nearest higher peak is Mount Amery,  to the north-northwest. Mount Erasmus can be seen from the Icefields Parkway west of Saskatchewan Crossing, with optimum photography conditions in morning light.

History

Mount Erasmus was named by James Hector in 1859 during the Palliser expedition for Peter Erasmus (1833-1931), who was an interpreter and guide for that exploration into the Canadian Rockies. Peter's skills as a Métis interpreter opened up the west for scientists, explorers, and government officials.

The first ascent of the mountain was made in 1950 by John C. Oberlin and Fred Ayres.

The mountain's name was officially adopted in 1957 by the Geographical Names Board of Canada.

Geology

Like other mountains in Banff Park, Mount Erasmus is composed of sedimentary rock laid down from the Precambrian to Jurassic periods. Formed in shallow seas, this sedimentary rock was pushed east and over the top of younger rock during the Laramide orogeny.

Climate

Based on the Köppen climate classification, Mount Erasmus is located in a subarctic climate zone with cold, snowy winters, and mild summers. Winter temperatures can drop below -20 °C with wind chill factors below -30 °C. In terms of favorable weather conditions, summer months are best for climbing. Precipitation runoff from Mount Erasmus drains into tributaries of the North Saskatchewan River.

Further reading

Buffalo Days and Nights, Author Peter Erasmus as told to Henry Thompson, Publisher Glenbow-Alberta Institute, 1976

See also

List of mountains of Canada
Geography of Alberta

References

External links
 Weather: Mount Erasmus
 Parks Canada web site: Banff National Park
 Dictionary of Canadian Biography: Peter Erasmus

Erasmus
Erasmus
Erasmus
Erasmus